This is a list of the heads of state of Grenada, from the independence of Grenada in 1974 to the present day.

The head of state under the Grenada Independence Act 1974 is the King of Grenada, Charles III, who is also the monarch in each of the other Commonwealth realms. The King is represented in Grenada by a Governor-General.

Monarch (1974–present)
The succession to the throne is the same as the succession to the British throne.

Governor-General
The Governor-General is the representative of the Monarch in Grenada and exercises most of the powers of the Monarch. The Governor-General is appointed for an indefinite term, serving at the pleasure of the Monarch. After the passage of the Statute of Westminster 1931, the Governor-General is appointed solely on the advice of the Cabinet of Grenada without the involvement of the British government. In the event of a vacancy the Chief Justice served as Officer Administering the Government.

Following is a list of people who have served as Governor-General of Grenada since independence in 1974.

Standards

References

External links
 World Statesmen – Grenada
 Rulers.org – Grenada

Government of Grenada